The British North America Acts 1867–1975 are a series of Acts of Parliament that were at the core of the constitution of Canada. Most were enacted by the Parliament of the United Kingdom and some by the Parliament of Canada. In Canada, some of the acts were repealed in Canada by the Constitution Act, 1982. The rest were renamed the Constitution Acts and amended, with those changes only having effect in Canada.  The Canadian versions of the Constitution Acts make up the Constitution of Canada, and can only be amended in Canada.

The British versions of the acts which remain in force in Britain are ordinary British statutes. They can be amended by the British Parliament, but those amendments would not have any effect in Canada.  They retain their original names and do not include any amendments made in Canada since 1982.

The term "British North America" (BNA) refers to the British colonies in North America, after 1783.

Constitutional changes

Canada dates its history as a country to the British North America Act, 1867, which came into effect on July 1, 1867. However, Canada was not established as fully independent, since the United Kingdom retained legislative control over Canada and full control over Canadian foreign policy. Canada did not have any foreign embassies until its first one was established in Washington, D.C., in 1926. Until 1949, changes to the British North America Acts could be made only by the British Parliament. The British North America (No. 2) Act, 1949, gave the Parliament of Canada the power to make limited constitutional amendments, but full Canadian control over the constitution was not achieved until the passage of the Canada Act 1982. This long delay was in large part due to the inability to agree upon a procedure for making constitutional amendments that was acceptable to all of the provinces, in particular the Province of Quebec.

Because of this, all British North America Acts dated before 1949 were passed by the British Parliament, while some of those dated after 1949 were passed by the Canadian Parliament. When Canada patriated its constitution with the passage of the Canada Act 1982, most of the British North America Acts were renamed as "Constitution Acts" in Canada, while a few of the acts were repealed as no longer having any relevance.  The acts are collectively called the Constitution Acts 1867 to 1982.

French-language versions
The fifteen BNA Acts enacted by the United Kingdom Parliament do not have official French-language versions. Only the English version is official. The five BNA Acts enacted by the Canadian Parliament do have official French-language versions, and the English-language and French-language versions are equally authoritative (as with all legislation enacted by the Canadian Parliament).

The French Constitutional Drafting Committee produced translations of all the British North America Acts, pursuant to section 55 of the Constitution Act, 1982, but these were never enacted by the federal and provincial governments through the constitutional amending process to make them official.

Individual Acts

The different Acts of this series are distinguished by appending the year of their enactment. BNA Acts were passed in 1867, 1871, 1886, 1907, 1915, 1916*, 1930, 1940, 1943*, 1946*, 1949, 1949 (No. 2)*, 1951*, 1952*, 1960, 1964, 1965, 1974, 1975 and 1975 (No. 2). Those marked with (*) were repealed in Canada in 1982, but are still in force in Britain. Five of the British North America Acts were enacted by the Parliament of Canada; namely those of 1952, 1965, 1974, 1975, and 1975 (No. 2). The other fifteen were enacted by the Imperial Parliament in London.

The first Act, the British North America Act, 1867, created the self-governing (internally) Dominion of Canada. The remaining acts dealt with a variety of topics, though the majority were concerned with modifying the representation in Parliament or in the Senate of Canada as the country enlarged and changed (1886, 1915, 1943, 1946, 1952, 1974, 1975, 1975 (No. 2)), adding the newer Provinces of Manitoba, British Columbia, Saskatchewan, Alberta, and Newfoundland. Other topics include modifying the country's boundaries (1871, 1949), transfer payments (1907), temporary changes due to two world wars (1916, 1943), federal-provincial powers (1930, 1964), power over changes in the constitution (1949 (No. 2)), the creation of new social programs (1951, 1964), and mandatory retirement ages in the Canadian government (1960, 1965)

British North America Act, 1867

The British North America Act, 1867, also known as the BNA Act, comprises a major part of the Constitution of Canada. The act entails the original creation of a federal dominion and sets the framework for much of the operation of the Government of Canada, including its federal structure, the House of Commons of Canada, the Senate, the justice system, and the taxation system. In 1982, this Act was renamed the Constitution Act, 1867, with the patriation of the constitution (having originally been enacted by the Parliament of the United Kingdom). Amendments were also made at this time: section 92A was added, giving the provinces greater control over non-renewable natural resources.

British North America Act, 1871

This Act gave Canada the power to establish new provinces and territories and to change provincial boundaries with the affected province's consent. The act recognized the creation of the province of Manitoba, and also the incorporation of Rupert's Land and the Northwest Territories into Canada. This Act also allowed the Canadian parliament and the legislatures of Ontario and Quebec to redraw the boundaries of the province of Ontario and the province of Quebec in order to include parts of these land acquisitions, specifically around Hudson Bay and James Bay. In 1982, this Act was renamed the Constitution Act, 1871.

British North America Act, 1886

This Act gave parliament the authority to allow the Territories of Canada to have representation in the Canadian Senate and Canadian House of Commons. In 1982, this Act was renamed the Constitution Act, 1886.

British North America Act, 1907

This Act regulated transfer payments by the Federal government to the smaller provinces to support their legislatures and governments. The funds transferred were set at between $100,000 and $250,000 depending on the province's population with an extra $100,000 a year for ten years to British Columbia. In 1982, this Act was renamed the Constitution Act, 1907.

British North America Act, 1915

This Act expanded the Senate of Canada by giving the Western Canadian provinces 24 senators, the same number that had been guaranteed to Ontario, Quebec, and the Maritime Provinces. This Act also guaranteed Newfoundland six senators should that British domain ever join the Confederation – which it did in 1949. Finally, this act amended section 51 of the British North America Act of 1867 to guarantee that no province would have fewer members of the House of Commons than of the senate. In 1982, this Act was renamed the Constitution Act, 1915.

British North America Act, 1916

This Act extended the duration of the 12th Canadian Parliament through October 1917, beyond the normal maximum of five years. The extension was carried out due to World War I. This Act was repealed by the Statute Law Revision Act, 1927.

British North America Act, 1930

This Act gave the newer provinces of British Columbia, Alberta, Manitoba, and Saskatchewan rights over certain natural resources found in federally controlled lands. In 1982, this Act was renamed the Constitution Act, 1930.

British North America Act, 1940

This Act gave the Federal government jurisdiction over unemployment insurance, thus allowing such a program to be established on a national level. An earlier attempt to create an Employment and Social Insurance Act during the Great Depression had been ruled to be unconstitutional, since unemployment assistance was judged by the courts to be a provincial responsibility. In 1982, this Act was renamed the Constitution Act, 1940.

British North America Act, 1943

This Act delayed redistribution of seats in the Canadian House of Commons until the end of World War II. This Act was repealed in 1982, as being completely outdated and obsolete.

British North America Act, 1946

This Act adjusted the formula for distributing seats in the Canadian House of Commons among the provinces and territories. This Act was repealed in 1982, as having been superseded.

British North America Act, 1949

This Act allowed for the entry of Newfoundland as Canada's tenth province. This Act was renamed the Newfoundland Act when the Canadian Constitution was patriated from the United Kingdom in 1982.

This Act should not be confused with the British North America (No. 2) Act 1949 (see below).

British North America (No. 2) Act, 1949

This Act granted Canada limited powers to amend its own constitution. The Parliament of Canada was thereafter allowed to amend the Canadian constitution in many areas of its own jurisdiction without first obtaining the consent of the British Parliament. However, the approval of the British Parliament was still needed for wider constitutional changes, such as those involving areas of provincial and federal  responsibilities. Therefore, this Act can at best be considered a "partial patriation" of the Canadian Constitution.

This Act was repealed in 1982 with the full patriation of the Canadian Constitution from the United Kingdom, and with the incorporation of a new, comprehensive procedure for amending the Constitution.

This Act is not to be confused with the British North America Act, 1949 (see above).

British North America Act, 1951
This Act gave the Federal government the power to pass legislation concerning old age pensions, while also recognizing the rights of provincial legislatures to do so. While the Canadian Parliament had established an old age pension program in 1927, this was administered by the provinces and jointly funded by them. This Act of the British Parliament allowed the Federal government of Canada to administer and operate its own pension plan and allowed it to pass the Old Age Security Act. This Act was repealed in 1982, since it had been superseded.

British North America Act, 1952

This was the first of the British North America Acts to be enacted by the Canadian Parliament (rather than by the British Parliament). That had been made possible under the provisions of the British North America (No. 2) Act, 1949.

This Act changed the number of seats in the House of Commons and it also limited the number of seats that a province could lose due to redistribution based on the national census to 15% of its previous number of seats. This Act also gave the Yukon Territory its own Member of Parliament. This Act was repealed in 1982 as having become obsolete and superseded.

British North America Act, 1960

This Act instituted a mandatory retirement age of 75 for all superior court judges. In 1982, this Act was renamed the Constitution Act, 1960.

British North America Act, 1964

This Act extended the federal government's jurisdiction over pensions to include those of survivor's benefits and disability benefits while continuing to allow the provinces to have their own pension programs. This amendment to the BNA Act made the Canada Pension Plan possible. In 1982, this Act was renamed the Constitution Act, 1964.

This was the last time that the British Parliament enacted legislation on Canada's behalf before the patriation of the Canadian constitution in 1982. The inability of Canada to amend its own constitution already seemed antiquated in 1964. In the debate, a British MP called it an "astonishing and absurd historical anomaly" that "the Canadian Parliament is the only Parliament in the Commonwealth that has to come to us to ask permission to legislate about domestic matters."

British North America Act, 1965

This was the second of the British North America Acts to be enacted by the Parliament of Canada. This was made possible by the provisions of the British North America (No. 2) Act, 1949.

This Act established a mandatory retirement age of 75 for all members who were appointed to the Canadian Senate in future. Those who had been appointed before the passage of this Act were exempted. In 1982, this Act was renamed the Constitution Act, 1965.

British North America Act, 1974

This was the third of the British North America Acts to be enacted by the Parliament of Canada. This had been made possible by the provisions of the British North America (No. 2) Act, 1949.

This Act changed the rules for the redistribution of seats in the House of Commons of Canada so that Quebec was allocated the fixed number of 75 seats, while the number of seats allocated to each of the other provinces would always be determined based upon the sizes of their populations in comparison with that of Quebec. However, the  Provinces continued to be guaranteed to have at least as many members of the House of Commons as they had Senators. In 1982, this Act was renamed the Constitution Act, 1974.

British North America Act, 1975

This was the fourth of the British North America Acts to be enacted by the Parliament of Canada. This had been made possible by the provisions of the British North America (No. 2) Act, 1949.

This Act increased the number of representatives from the Northwest Territories in the Canadian House of Commons, from one to two members. In 1982, this Act was renamed the Constitution Act (No. 1), 1975.

British North America Act (No. 2), 1975

This was the fifth of the British North America Acts to be enacted by the Parliament of Canada.

This Act increased the number of seats in the Canadian Senate from 102 to 104, and it allocated one seat to the Yukon Territory and one to the Northwest Territories. In 1982, this Act was renamed the Constitution Act (No. 2), 1975.

Canada Act 1982

This final Act of the British Parliament regarding Canada had a different name, since it renamed all of the unrepealed earlier British North America Acts, amended some of them, and repealed all others, patriated all remaining legislative and constitutional powers to Canada, and included the Constitution Act, 1982 as its schedule. It is the only UK legislation to be enacted in both English and French, although the French version only has equal authority in Canada.

See also

Canadian Confederation
List of Canadian constitutional documents

References

External links
 The original acts cited below are held by the Parliamentary Archives.

British North America
Constitution of Canada

Canada and the Commonwealth of Nations
United Kingdom and the Commonwealth of Nations